Grimstad is a Norwegian surname. Notable people with the surname include:

Edvard Grimstad (1933–2014), Norwegian politician
May-Helen Molvær Grimstad (born 1968), Norwegian politician
Lars Joachim Grimstad (born 1972), Norwegian football midfielder
Per Ø. Grimstad (born 1934), Norwegian businessperson, diplomat and politician

See also
Grimstad, town in Norway

Norwegian-language surnames